Static Rook (居飛車 ibisha) openings in shogi typically have the player's rook at its start position, which is the second file (on the 28 square) for Black and the eighth file (on the 82 square) for White.

Explanation

Static Rook is a set of openings in which the rook remains on its starting square, which is the 28 square if played by Black and the 82 square if played by White.

It is also possible to include other openings where the rook moves to another file that is still on the players right side of the board, such as the third file or the fourth file. The reason for including these other openings where the rook is not technically static is because the typical castle fortifications constructed to the protect the Static Rook player's king are usually the same for these openings. Nonetheless, some shogi theory does categorize these openings with right side rook movement into the same group as Ranging Rook openings despite the disparity in castle formation.

A Static Rook position can be chosen independently from what the opponent's position is. Thus, the term opening has a slightly different meaning in shogi than in western chess, which uses the term opening for positions used by the first player and the term defense for positions used by the second player. In shogi, either player can use a Static Rook or Ranging Rook position. When both players use a Static Rook position, then the opening is considered a Double Static Rook opening, most of which have specific names, such as the Double Fortress opening, the Bishop Exchange opening, etc. When the one player chooses a Static Rook position while the other player chooses a Ranging Rook position, then the opening is considered simply a Ranging Rook opening or, when more precise, a Ranging Rook vs Static Rook opening. This is both when Black plays Static Rook while White plays Ranging Rook and when Black plays Ranging Rook while White plays Static Rook. And, when referring specifically to the Static Rook position in these Ranging Rook vs Static Rook openings, the Static Rook side is a Counter-Ranging Rook opening.

Relation to castles

Most Static Rook openings coincide with a castle development on the player's left side of board. In the adjacent diagram is an example of a castle built on the left side of the board paired with a Static Rook position. The castle is a Left Silver Crown Anaguma (with advanced edge pawn).

Static Rook castles can be divided into two main categories: Double Static Rook castles and Counter-Ranging Rook castles. Different structures are required in these two cases since the attack patterns of the player's opponent differ. In Double Static Rook openings, a Static Rook player's king is initially threatened from above by the opponent's rook which has remained on its starting square. In Counter-Ranging Rook openings, the Static Rook king is initially threatened from the king's right side and/or obliquely from the king's right upper corner.

Castles in Double Static Rook openings have a wide variety of forms that are dependent upon the specific opening used. Some openings like Fortress and Bishop Exchange openings have the king moved leftward away from the rook in compact castles while openings like Double Wing Attack and Side Pawn Capture have rather minimal castle formations with much less king safety in a trade off of defending wider areas within the Static Rook side's camp in order to defend against future piece drops.

The Static Rook pawn push

One of the most prominent features of a Static Rook position is pushing the pawn directly above the rook forward. In even games, this forward marching rook pawn (飛車先 hisha saki) bears down directly on the opponent's bishop, which in the initial position is undefended.

When faced with this rook pawn push, the Static Rook's opponent must prevent this pawn from breaking through their camp by developing a piece to defend this file. In addition, the opponent must decide whether to allow the Static Rook player to exchange this rook pawn off the board or to prevent this pawn exchange from happening.

The Rook pawn exchange.

G-32.

S-32.

Preventing the Rook pawn exchange.

P-34, B-33.

P-14, B-13.

P-34, S-32/S-42, S-33

(P-34) R-22.

Double Static Rook

There are many Double Static Rook openings. The most popular openings are the following:

 Fortress
 Bishop Exchange
 Double Wing Attack
 Side Pawn Capture
 Left Mino

Counter-Ranging Rook Static Rook

Left Silver-57 Rapid Attack

Left Silver-57 Rapid Attack (5七銀左急戦 go-nana gin hidari kyūsen) is a fast attacking formation used with several different Static Rook openings by Black against White's Ranging Rook positions. Black's attacking formation is usually combined with a Boat castle (at least initially).

Static Rook Anaguma

King's Head Vanguard Pawn

Super High Speed Silver-37

Super High Speed Silver-37 (超速3七銀 chōsoku san-nana gin) is a rapid attacking formation used with a Static Rook position by Black often against White's Cheerful Central Rook.

Iijima Bishop Pullback

Iijima Bishop Pullback (飯島流引き角 Iijima-ryuu hiki kaku) is a Static Rook opening used against a Ranging Rook opponent.

It is characterized by not opening the bishop's diagonal and instead moving the bishop down (to 3a if played by White or 7i if played by Black) so that it can then exit one's camp via the central file.

Takishita's Spread Golds

Takishita's Spread Golds (滝下流対振り飛車金開き takishita-ryū tai furibisha kinbiraki) is a Counter-Ranging Rook trap opening that uses a Central House castle along with a Floating Rook shape. It aims for a surprise edge attack on the ninth file with support from the floating rook if the Ranging Rook opponent uses a Mino castle.

Other types

Right Fourth File Rook

Sleeve Rook

First File Rook

Kurukuru Bishop

Kurukuru Bishop (クルクル角 kurukuru kaku) is a Static Rook opening similar to the Iijima Bishop Pullback.

It is characterized by not opening the bishop's diagonal with a pawn push and instead moving the bishop up to the player's left edge (B-9g for Black, B-1c for White). The player subsequently moves their up to the middle e rank and then down to central file (B-7e ... B-5g for Black, B-3e ... B-5c for White.) The player can then castle their king leftwards into a Left Mino.

Substrategies

Climbing Silver

The Climbing Silver (棒銀 bōgin) attack involves advancing a silver upward along with an advanced or dropped pawn supported by the rook aiming to break through the opponent's camp on their bishop's side.

In the board diagram here, the Black's silver has successfully climbed to the e rank on the first file (1e).

A subsequent attack by Black, for example, could aim to sacrifice this silver in order to remove White's lance and then drop a dangling pawn within White's camp that threatens to promote.

Climbing Silver formations may be used with several different Static Rook openings such as Fortress, Double Wing, and Bishop Exchange.

Primitive Climbing Silver (原始棒銀 genshi bōgin) is a variant of Climbing Silver that attempts to use only a silver, rook, and pawn to attack. It is called primitive since such a simple strategy will not be successful if defended against properly.

Reclining Silver

Reclining Silver (腰掛け銀 koshikake gin) is a formation in which a player's right silver has advanced to the front of their camp on the middle 5th file and has an advanced pawn on the silver's right and pawn directly under the silver. The reclining name is meant to describe the way this silver rests on these two pawns as if it were seated on them.

In the board diagram, both Black and White have created Reclining Silver positions. Black has their silver on 5f (with pawns on 4f and 5g) while White has their silver on 5d (pawns on 5c, 6d).

Reclining Silver can often played as a component of different Static Rook openings such as Double Wing or Bishop Exchange. (However, it can also be played in Double Ranging Rook games.)

Climbing Gold

Right King

See also

 Ranging Rook
 Shogi opening
 Shogi strategy

References

Bibliography

External links

YouTube: HIDETCHI's Shogi Openings:
 Lesson #17: Castles for Double Static Rook Opening
 Lesson #19: Castles for Static Rook against Swinging Rook

Shogi openings